The Balkan Half Marathon Championships is an annual international competition over the half marathon between athletes from the Balkans. Organised by the Association of the Balkan Athletics Federations, it was inaugurated in 2012. It is one of two road running championships for the region, alongside the Balkan Marathon Championships.

The championships features races for both men and women. National team competitions are held within the individual races, with each nation's score being the total of the finishing positions of their best three athletes.

Editions

References

External links
Official website for Balkan Athletics

Cross Country Championships
Half marathons
Recurring sporting events established in 2012
European international sports competitions
Athletics team events
2012 establishments in Europe